As a competitive strongman, Iceland's Hafþór Júlíus Björnsson has won 56 national and international competitions out of 96 he had attempted from 2009 - 2020. Following his debut at 2009 Westfjord's Viking competition where he secured 4th place, he never failed to make it to the podium in the National circuit ever again, winning 26 out of 31 national competitions. At the international circuit, Hafþór has competed in 65 competitions across multiple strength federations, making it to the podium 49 times while winning 30 of them, making him the 3rd most decorated Strongman of all-time. 

Below depicts the chronological competitive record of the Icelander.

References

Bjornsson, Hafthor Julius